Dawi (also spelled as Davi, Daavi or Daway) is a Gharghasht Pashtun tribe and the brother of the Kakar tribe. Both are the sons of Gharghasht tribe. The population of Davi tribe is almost equal to that of the Kakar tribe but apparently seems smaller than Kakar because of the close ties of both tribes; they intermingled and mixed so closely that most Davi tribesmen consider themselves as part of Kakar tribe. Therefore, a large portion of Davi tribe is part of Kakar. The ancestral property of Daavi tribe is located at Kakar Khurasan in district Zhob where one dam on the name of "Daavi Dam" is located which was constructed some four hundred years ago. 

The Davi tribesmen mostly live in Afghanistan, Baluchistan, Kashmir and India. Where there is a Kakar tribe, Davi will also be there living together either with name of Kakar or Davi. They also live in Pukhtoonkhwa, especially in Katlang, Dheri, Babozai and Sawal Dher, Mardan. Many Nawab families of Hindustan and the Sardars of Quetta belong to the Davi tribe. Senator and writer Abdul Hadi Dawai is also a Davi.

Sub-tribes
 Hamar (همر)
 Dummar (دومړ)
 Ab Ul Maali (ابوالمعالي)
 Khondai (خوندی)(also spelled as Khujandi خجندي) adopted son of Sayed.

References 
 http://www.khyber.org/pashtotribes/g/ghorghasht.shtml
The Gazetteer of Balochistan.
Ashjar Ul Akhiar By Maulana Muhammad Ubaidullah Janfidaa Naqibi.
Tareekh-e-Khan Jahani By Naimatullah Harvi

Gharghashti Pashtun tribes
Pashto-language surnames